The John Deere Model GP tractor was a two-plow, and later a three-plow row-crop tractor produced by John Deere from 1928 to 1935. Initially called the John Deere Model C, the name was changed to GP as a result of difficulties in distinguishing between the Model C and Model D over the telephones of the time. It was intended as a response to the Farmall Regular line of general-purpose tractors produced under the Farmall brand by International Harvester..

Description and production
The original C was first produced in 1927. Intended as a general-purpose row-crop tractor to compete with the Farmall line, the tractor had a wide arched front axle to straddle three rows of crops In 1928 the tractor was renamed the GP, following confusion in distinguishing between "C" and "D"  over the telephone. The C's innovations included a mechanical implement lift and front and rear power take-offs. The GP had a three-speed transmission. Both gasoline and kerosene-fueled versions were available. All GPs were manufactured at the John Deere factory in Waterloo, Iowa, where 30,535 were built.

A two-row version, the GPWT (GP wide-tread) was introduced in 1930 with a tricycle configuration, featuring close-set front wheels. By 1931 the GP's engine had  displacement, for  drawbar and  measurements, allowing a three-plow rating. This also allowed the elimination of water injection, which had been used in the smaller engines to avoid pre-detonation.

The GPWT was introduced in 1932,  longer, with a simplified steering system that was arranged over the engine.

Variants
The Model P was produced specifically for potato cultivation from 1930 to 1931 with a  rear wheel tread. Later models of the GP could be fitted with adapters to achieve the same result. The GPO was adapted for orchard work, with lower axles. The GPO-L was a tracked version.

References

John Deere tractors